Yuri Rafailevich Khusyainov (born 30 June 1983) is a former Russian professional footballer.

Club career
He made his debut for FC Lokomotiv Moscow on 2 April 2004 in the Russian Premier League Cup game against FC Torpedo-Metallurg Moscow.

He played two seasons in the Russian Football National League for FC Baltika Kaliningrad.

References

1983 births
Footballers from Moscow
Living people
Russian footballers
Association football midfielders
FC Lokomotiv Moscow players
FC Gomel players
FC Baltika Kaliningrad players
FC Lokomotiv Kaluga players
Belarusian Premier League players
Russian expatriate footballers
Expatriate footballers in Belarus